Black Hills Express is a 1943 American Western film directed by John English and starring Don 'Red' Barry, Wally Vernon and Ariel Heath.

The film's art direction was by Russell Kimball.

Partial cast
 Don 'Red' Barry as Lon Walker  
 Wally Vernon as Deputy Deadeye  
 Ariel Heath as Gale Southern  
 George J. Lewis as Henchman Vic Fowler  
 William Halligan as Marshal Harvey Dorman  
 Hooper Atchley as Jason Phelps  
 Charles Miller as Raymond Harper  
 Pierce Lyden as Henchman Carl  
 Jack Rockwell as Sheriff  
 Bob Kortman as Henchman Dutch  
 Al Taylor as Henchman Denver aka Stoner

References

Bibliography
  Len D. Martin. The Republic Pictures Checklist: Features, Serials, Cartoons, Short Subjects and Training Films of Republic Pictures Corporation, 1935-1959. McFarland, 1998.

External links
 

1943 films
1943 Western (genre) films
American Western (genre) films
Films directed by John English
Republic Pictures films
American black-and-white films
1940s English-language films
1940s American films